ADX-47273 is a research pharmaceutical developed by Addex Therapeutics which acts as a positive allosteric modulator (PAM) selective for the metabotropic glutamate receptor subtype mGluR5. It has nootropic and antipsychotic effects in animal studies, and has been used as a lead compound to develop improved derivatives.

See also
 Dipraglurant
 Raseglurant

References

Oxadiazoles
MGlu5 receptor agonists